The Panhellenion or Panhellenium was a league of Greek city-states established in the year 131–132 AD by the Roman Emperor Hadrian while he was touring the Roman provinces of Greece.

Hadrian was philhellene and idealized the Classical past of Greece. The Panhellenion was part of this philhellenism, and was set up, with Athens at the centre, to try to recreate the apparent "unified Greece" of the 5th century BC, when the Greeks took on the Persian enemy.

The Panhellenion was primarily a religious organization, and most of the deeds of the institution which we have relate to its own self-governing. Admission to the Panhellenion was subject to scrutiny of a city's Hellenic descent.

In 137 AD, the Panhellenic Games were held at Athens as part of the ideal of Panhellenism and harking back to the Panathenaic Festival of the fifth century.

From inscriptions found, member cities included Athens, Megara, Sparta, Chalcis, Argos, Acraephiae, Epidaurus, Amphicleia, Methana, Corinth, Hypata, Demetrias, Thessalonica, Magnesia on the Maeander, Eumeneia, as well the cities of Crete.

The name was revived by the first governor of modern Greece, Ioannis Kapodistrias, for a short-lived advisory body in 1828.

References

Other sources

 

 

 

Historical legislatures
Society of ancient Greece
131 establishments
130s establishments in the Roman Empire
Greece in the Roman era
Leagues in Greek Antiquity
Greco-Roman relations in classical antiquity
2nd century in Greece
Hadrian